Woodfield Spring Plantation was a large quail hunting plantation in northern Leon County, Florida, United States.

Woodfield Springs was owned by Gilbert W. Humphrey, an executive with the M.A. Hanna Company of Cleveland, Ohio serving as president of the company in 1960 and chairman of the board in 1961. Humphrey's father also was an executive with Hanna and U.S. Secretary of the Tresaury.  Mr. Humphrey's father in law was Robert Livingston Ireland, Jr., owner of Foshalee Plantation.

Adjacent plantations:
Ring Oak Plantation western section on the south.
Horseshoe Plantation to the west

Tragedy
On October 5, 1967, Astronaut Clifton C. Williams died instantly when his T-38 Talon crashed in a remote part of Woodfield Springs.

References

Plantations in Leon County, Florida